Unity Jiu Jitsu is a Brazilian jiu-jitsu academy and team started in 2015 with its headquarter based in New York City. Murilo Santana is the head instructor. The academy is known as one of the top talent-producing facilities in the sport.

History 
Unity Jiu Jitsu was established in New York City in January 2015 by Paulo Miyao, his brother Joao, Ana Lowry, and Yago de Souza, all from Cicero Costha’s academy in Brazil as well as Murilo Santana from Barbosa Academy. Murilo Santana is the head instructor while the Miyao brothers and Yago De Souza were resident athletes.

The first Unity members to compete at the 2015 IBJJF World Championship were Paulo & Joao Miyao, Murilo Santana, Leandro Lo, Luiza Monteiro, Yago De Souza, Mitch MacDonald, Devhonte Johnson, Matheus Francisco, Junny Ocasio, Brian Richards, Alix Cornu, Thiago Abud, Andres Limongi, Johnavelle Gabriel, Tanner Rice, Ana Lowry, Asif Mansoor, and Antoine Delannoy. Unity ended their first world championship in the top ten academies with 19 points.
In June 2020 the Miyao Brothers announced their departure from the team.

Notable members
A list of current and former members:

Thiago Abud
Mayssa Bastos
Felipe Cesar
Margot Ciccarelli
Eddie Cummings
Yago de Souza 
Jeferson Guaresi
Devhonte Johnson
Levi Jones-Leary
Leandro Lo
Paulo Miyao 
Joao Miyao
Chloé McNally
Luiza Monteiro
Italo Moura
Edwin Ocasio
Junny Ocasio
Sebastian Rodriguez

See also
 Brazilian Jiu-Jitsu
 Grappling

References 

Brazilian jiu-jitsu organizations